Labertouche is a locality in Victoria, Australia, located on Jacksons Track, in the Shire of Baw Baw. At the 2016 census, Labertouche had a population of 356.

The first post office in Labertouche opened on 5 April 1876.

The locality is named after Peter Paul Labertouche, the Secretary of the Victorian Railways Department in the late nineteenth century, and who descended from an Irish Huguenots family.

A school was opened in 1880 and continues to operate.

The tree species Grevillea barklyana is endemic to an area near Labertouche.

Notable residents
Lionel Rose Australian Aboriginal boxer, born at Jacksons Track settlement near Labertouche and attended Labertouche Primary School.

Places of interest
Labertouche Cave – granite caves

References

Towns in Victoria (Australia)
Shire of Baw Baw